Philotheca sericea is a species of flowering plant in the family Rutaceae and is endemic to the south-west of Western Australia. It is an undershrub with small oval to elliptical leaves and white to pink flowers usually arranged singly at the end of branchlets.

Description
The leaves are fleshy, oval to elliptical, flat on the top and rounded on the lower side. The ten stamens are joined at the base and hairy.

Taxonomy and naming
This philotheca was first formally described in 1970 by Paul Wilson who gave it the name Eriostemon sericeus and published the description in the journal Nuytsia from specimens collected by Nathaniel Speck near Kalli in 1964. In 1998, Wilson changed the name to Philotheca sericea in the same journal.

Distribution and habitat
Philotheca sericea grows in shrubland, often near granite or laterite, from near Geraldton to near  Sandstone in the south-west of Western Australia.

Conservation status
This philotheca is classified as "not threatened" by the Government of Western Australia Department of Parks and Wildlife.

References

sericea
Flora of Western Australia
Sapindales of Australia
Plants described in 1970
Taxa named by Paul G. Wilson